Mount Biao is a volcanic peak on the island of Bioko in Equatorial Guinea. At 2009 metres above sea level, it is the third highest point on the island and in the country.

Volcanoes of Equatorial Guinea
Bioko